Maja Ksulje e Priftit  (Macedonian and , Šerupa) is mountain peak found in the tri-point of Kosovo, Albania and North Macedonia. Albania contains the south-west and north-west, Kosovo the north-east and south-east and North Macedonia the south.

Notes and references

Notes:

References:

International mountains of Europe
Šar Mountains
Two-thousanders of Albania
Two-thousanders of Kosovo
Two-thousanders of North Macedonia
Albania–Kosovo border
Albania–North Macedonia border
Kosovo–North Macedonia border
Geography of Kukës County